Liz Waldner is an American poet.

Life
Waldner was raised in small town Mississippi. At 28, she received a B.A. in philosophy and mathematics from St. John's College; she later studied at the Summer Language School in French Middlebury College, and received an M.F.A. from the Iowa Writers' Workshop. Waldner was a Regents Fellow in the Communication Department at the University of California, San Diego.

She is the author of eight poetry collections, most recently Play (Lightful Press) and Trust (winner of the Cleveland State University Poetry Center Open Competition). Her collection, Dark Would (the missing person) (University of Georgia Press), was the winner of the 2002 Contemporary Poetry Series; her collection, Self and Simulacra (2001), won the Beatrice Hawley Award; and her collection, A Point Is That Which Has No Part (2000), received the 1999 Iowa Poetry Prize and the 2000 James Laughlin Award from the Academy of American Poets.

Other honors include grants from the Washington State Professional Development Grant for Artists, Massachusetts Cultural Council Artist Fellowship, the Boomerang Foundation, the Gertrude Stein Award for Innovative Poetry and the Barbara Deming Money for Women Grant. She received fellowships from the Vermont Studio Center, the Djerassi Foundation, Centrum, Hedgebrook, Virginia Center for the Creative Arts, Villa Montalvo, Fundación Valparaiso and the MacDowell Colony.

Waldner's poem "The Ballad of Barding Gaol", along with a selection of others, won the Poetry Society of America's Robert M. Winner Memorial Award, and her poetry has appeared in literary journals and magazines such as Ploughshares, Poetry, The New Yorker, The American Poetry Review, The Journal, Parnassus West, The Cortland Review, Electronic Poetry Review, Colorado Review, Denver Quarterly, New American Writing, ''Indiana Review, Abacus, and VOLT.

She was an adjunct at Millsaps College in Jackson MS (1988–90) where she used the "Eyes On The Prize" PBS series as a text in her freshman comp course, inviting the college community to regard it as an all-college text; sponsored and served as panelist on the first Environmental Symposium; began with her students a campus recycling program; was advisor for the Rape Awareness office; co-led an NIH symposium on Suffering and Tragedy, gave a paper at the Philosophy Department's Colloquium, and attempted to live on $1000 a course.

Her other teaching positions included Lecturer at Tufts University, the Institute for Language and Thinking at Bard College, Cornell College, Hugo House (Seattle), and the College of Wooster.

Other Awards

 2017: Foundation for Contemporary Arts Dorothea Tanning Award
 2004: Northern California Book Awards
 2001: Beatrice Hawley Award
 2000: James Laughlin Award

Published works

Full-length poetry collections

Chapbooks

Works published in periodicals

Ploughshares

References

External links
 Academy of American Poets > Poets > Liz Waldner
 Video: Liz Waldner Poetry Reading - Part 1 > 20th Annual Literary Festival > October 15, 1997 > Old Dominion University
 Alice James Books > Author Page > Liz Waldner

Poets from Ohio
Writers from Mississippi
Writers from Cleveland
Living people
Iowa Writers' Workshop alumni
St. John's College (Annapolis/Santa Fe) alumni
Middlebury College alumni
American women poets
Poets from Mississippi
Year of birth missing (living people)
21st-century American women